Louis de Sacy (1654, Paris – 26 October 1727, Paris) was a French author, and lawyer.  He was the third member elected to occupy seat 2 of the Académie française in 1701. De Sacy was particularly known for his elegant translations of Pliny the Younger's Epistulae and Panegyricus Traiani.

Bibliography
 Lettres de Pline le Jeune (1699-1701)
 Traité de l’amitié  (1703)
 Traité de la gloire  (1715)

References

1654 births
1727 deaths
Writers from Paris
Members of the Académie Française
French male writers